Hugh Pugh is a news reporter for the fictitious Look Out Wales reports featured on comedy sketch show Barry Welsh Is Coming. He is played by Welsh comedian, John Sparkes, and his name is a parody of Welsh names in general. He first appeared in 1997.

Reports
Hugh Pugh is a reporter in Fishguard in West Wales, and his reports are constantly in black and white (though he has briefly appeared in colour). It is explained that Fishguard itself is in black and white because it is behind the rest of [Wales]. The news reports are made to match old news reels to accommodate Sparkes' jokes. Hugh Pugh holds an old-fashioned microphone in one hand, but is always holding the lead's plug in the other.

Hugh Pugh vs. Barry Welsh
Hugh Pugh himself has a grudge against Barry Welsh, partly because Cardiff is more "advanced" than Fishguard, and partly because Barry Welsh is the host of the show.

Fans and viewing figures suggest that Hugh Pugh is the most popular segment of Barry Welsh Is Coming.

Fishguard
According to Hugh Pugh, Fishguard is managed by Mayor Kenny Twat, who owns a vineyard where he manufactures a wine named Chateau Myself (a play on the offensive phrase, "shat on myself"). Other residents of Fishguard include:

The Mayor's 7-year-old son Rasputin Twat
Terry Phone - Member of Fishguard Telephone Club
Norman Helmet - A fireman
Dung Bowen - A farmer
Mr. Clinic-Lee Dead - Retired soldier. He was to have been presented with a medal many years ago, but his regiment lost it. The local council stepped in with a replacement, but this too was lost, so he was presented with a frozen chicken instead.
Mrs. Hideous
Geraint Pillock - Coracle Enthusiast, attempts bizarre feats in a coracle "mainly because it's a challenge, a challenge for me and a challenge for the coracle"
The Pop Tarts - A Welsh girl group poking fun at Spice Girls, featuring Big Tart, Ugly Tart, Cheap Tart and Stupid Tart)
Anne Robinson
Trevor McDonald
Pamela Anderson
The Welsh-Language Homosexual Society
The West Wales Tortoise Impersonation Society
The Royal Fish-Guards (Led by Colonel "Tosser" Thompson)
Mr. Slightly Thomas (Deceased - Previously mentioned in Absolutely)
Fishguard Staring Club (Its rivals are the Haverfordwest Glaring Society)
Doctor Raj Willseeyounow at St. Sardines Hospital (Previously mentioned in Absolutely)
Doctor Jekyll, 92-year-old plastic surgeon at St. Sardines Hospital who is extremely short sighted; "'av I got my eyes open?". One woman patient who went in for a simple tummy tuck ended up with seven knees - on her face
Professor Zip Fastener, an expert in trouser physics at Fishguard College of Technology
Sam and Ella Vomit, owners of 'Sam and Ella's' (a play on "salmonella") restaurant which serves the cheapest meals in Wales, mainly by using only condemned meat

Crime in Fishguard is kept under control by Detective Chief Inspector Shortarse, leader of the Santa Squad, a crime unit featuring policemen all dressed as Santa Claus. The most wanted man in Fishguard is ganglord Larry Island (A satire of Barry Island), who runs a gang of baby criminals trained to steal toys and make forgery paintings. Members of the gang include Mad One-Eyed Jack and Baby-Faced Baby.

Transport in Fishguard is restricted to motor vehicles for moving about in the town. A small railway, the Fishguard - Fishguard Railway (run by Fishrail) is also used. To get around outside of Fishguard, the main mode of transport is lace-up shoes, although there are elastic-sided boots on some routes. A pipeline was also built to pump thousands of tourists each year into West Wales, but the casualties from its first run meant that it was soon replaced by an A-Road.

Most of the newsreels of Fishguard are doctored from old newscasts from the 1960s, with the names of celebrities altered for humour, including Richard Cliff (Cliff Richard) and East Clintwood (Clint Eastwood).

Spin-off specials
Hugh Pugh has featured in four one-off specials of Barry Welsh Is Coming. The first, in 1999, was The Fishguard Film Festival, which won the BAFTA Cymru award for Best Light Entertainment.

Then in 2004, the character presented a mockumentary about the history of Wales, stretching from the Stone Age to the modern day. The History of Wales according to Hugh Pugh went on to win the BAFTA Cymru award for Best Light Entertainment a year later.

Barry Welsh  Is Coming returned in 2007 with a series of three themed specials broadcast throughout the year starring Hugh Pugh. Barry Welsh Has An Election (broadcast: 3 May 2007) featured mock coverage of the Fishguard mayoral election whilst Hugh Pugh Kicks Off (broadcast: 6 September 2007) took an offbeat look at the Rugby World Cup. A Christmas special, Hugh Pugh's Christmas Cracker  (broadcast: 18 December 2007) featured highlights from the past ten years of spoof news bulletins and reports from Fishguard.

References

Comedy television characters
Fictional reporters